Marques del Duero was a  of the Spanish Navy which fought in the Battle of Manila Bay during the Spanish–American War.

Technical characteristics
Marques del Duero was a first-class gunboat, or "aviso", built by La Seyne in France.  She was laid down on 20 January 1875, launched on 3 May 1875, and completed the same year.  She was designed to fight against the Carlists in the Mediterranean and the Bay of Biscay during the Third Carlist War, patrolling off Carlist ports to intercept contraband and blockade the ports, and also providing despatch services between Spanish Navy forces operating off various ports, hence her Spanish designation of aviso, meaning "warning." She had an iron hull with a very prominent ram bow, was coal-fired, was rigged as a schooner, and could carry 89 tons of coal. She was reclassified as a third-class gunboat in 1895.

Operational history
The Spanish took delivery of Marques del Duero from her French builders at Marseilles, France. She set out on her first operational deployment from Marseilles on 27 July 1875, heading for San Sebastián Bay in northern Spain for blockade, patrol, and despatch duty. She served there beyond the end of the Third Carlist War on 27 February 1876, finally leaving after Spanish naval forces there began to leave for postwar duties after 5 April 1876.

On 29 July 1876, Marques del Duero departed Spain for the Philippines, where she was based at Zamboanga, assigned to the South Division of the Asiatic Squadron.

On 24 July 1880, Marques del Duero left Philippine waters for courtesy visits to the kings of Siam and Annam at Saigon and Singapore.

On 27 September 1895, Marques del Duero captured several pirate launches manned by Moros in Borneo.  She later attacked a group of Moro and Tagalog pirates, killing 18 and wounding 30.

Marques del Duero was the oldest member of Rear Admiral Patricio Montojo de Pasaron's Pacific Squadron at Manila in the Philippine Islands when the Spanish–American War broke out in April 1898. She was anchored with the squadron in Cañacao Bay under the lee of the Cavite Peninsula east of Sangley Point, Luzon, eight miles southwest of Manila, when, early on the morning of 1 May 1898, the United States Navy's Asiatic Squadron under Commodore George Dewey, found Montojo's anchorage and attacked. In the resulting Battle of Manila Bay, the first major engagement of the Spanish–American War, Marques del Duero took one , one , and about three other shell hits, which wrecked her bow gun, a side gun, and an engine. Her crew scuttled her in shallow water; part of her upper works remained above water, and a boarding crew from the gunboat  went aboard and set these on fire at the end of battle.

After the war, a U.S. Navy salvage team raised and repaired Marques del Duero.  She served briefly in the U.S. Navy as USS P-17, but was decommissioned and scrapped in 1900.

Notes

References
 Chesneau, Roger, and Eugene M. Kolesnik, Eds. Conway's All The World's Fighting Ships 1860–1905. New York, New York: Mayflower Books Inc., 1979. .
 Nofi, Albert A. The Spanish–American War. Conshohocken, Pennsylvania: Combined Books Inc., 1996. .

External links
 The Spanish–American War Centennial Website: Marques del Duero

Gunboats of Spain
Ships of the Spanish Navy
1875 ships
Ships built in France
Spanish–American War gunboats of Spain
Maritime incidents in 1898
Scuttled vessels
Shipwrecks of the Spanish–American War
Shipwrecks in the South China Sea
Shipwrecks of the Philippines